This is a list of Turkish football transfers for the 2009 summer transfer window by club. Only transfers of clubs in the Süper Lig are included.

Süper Lig 2009–10

Ankaragücü

In:

Out:

Ankaraspor

In:

Out:

Antalyaspor

In:

Out:

Beşiktaş

In:

Out:

Bursaspor

In:

Out:

Denizlispor

In:

Out:

Diyarbakırspor

In:

Out:

Eskişehirspor

In:

Out:

Fenerbahçe

In:

Out:

Galatasaray

In:

Out:

Gaziantepspor

In:

Out:

Gençlerbirliği

In:

Out:

İstanbul BB

In:

Out:

Kasımpaşa

In:

Out:

Kayserispor

In:

Out:

Manisaspor

In:

Out:

Sivasspor

In:

Out:

Trabzonspor

In:

Out:

References

Transfers
Turkey
2009